Matuavi (also Mutuavi) is an island of the Sikaiana atoll in the Malaita Province, Solomon Islands in the South Pacific.

Geography
Matuavi is one of four islands of Sikaiana, a remote tropical coral atoll. Matuavi lies at the south-western end of the atoll. The other islands of the atoll are Sikaiana (east), Tehaolei (north), and Faore (west).

References

External links
 

Islands of the Solomon Islands